Brownstoner Magazine began as "a Brooklyn-based website" and in 2017 added a printed edition.

Founder Victoria Schneps-Yunis's company, Schneps Communications, "operates some 20 print newspapers, 10 digital publications and employs about 90 staff members."

History

Weblog
Brownstoner began as a blog in 2004. A "sister" site named Queens Brownstoner was begun in 2013 by Brownstoner founder Jonathan Butler, who also launched Brooklyn Flea and Smorgasburg.

One of Brownstoner'''s bloggers, "a lay historian who writes eight times a week about Brooklyn architecture," also contributes to Brownstoner's "of the day" award feature and does "one post a month to introduce the charms of" upstate New York architecture"Writing under the pen name Montrose Morris" (where she has lived since 2012).

BlankSlateBrownstoner was acquired by BlankSlate in 2015 after "10 years and more than 42,000 blog posts." BlankSlate was founded by Kael Goodman as a digital marketing agency; Brownstoner was a client.

Schneps CommunicationsSchneps Communications acquired Brownstoner from BlankSlate in 2017. Schneps also publishes "Brokelyn, The Brooklyn Home Reporter, The Brooklyn Spectator and The Queens Courier."

Building of the day awardBrownstoners Building of the Day' award recognizes architectural notability."Listing of the day" is how Butler's Queens Brownstoner lists that publication's awards

CoverageBrownstoner writes about the past and the present:" 
 a 1650s building "believed to be the oldest existing building in New York State,
 the laying out of the street grid
 effect by development of the NYC train system's three component divisions on the growth of housing
 areas that were "farmland for centuries, even when .. parts of Brooklyn were growing into a city."
 noting a web site that listed more than 100 "micro-neighborhoods" in Brooklyn
 two-family houses "developed by Fred Trump, father of Donald."
  "15 to 20 posts a day ... market analysis and new developments."Brownstoner'' founder Butler conceded that much of his eclectic material comes from tips.

See also
 Long Island Press
 The Villager (Manhattan)

References

Architecture magazines
Magazines established in 2004
Magazines published in New York City
Visual arts magazines published in the United States